Mamary Traoré (born April 29, 1980 in Paris) is a Malian football defender. He last played for Kalloni F.C. in the Greek Beta Ethniki.

Career
Traoré previously played for Grenoble Foot 38 in France's Ligue 2 and Kallithea F.C. in the Greek Beta Ethniki.

International career
He was a member of the Malian national squad at the 2004 African Cup of Nations.

References

External links
 Mamary Traoré Official website
 

1980 births
Living people
Malian footballers
French footballers
Associação Naval 1º de Maio players
Grenoble Foot 38 players
Proodeftiki F.C. players
Kallithea F.C. players
Ethnikos Asteras F.C. players
Ligue 2 players
Malian expatriate footballers
Expatriate footballers in Portugal
Expatriate footballers in Greece
2004 African Cup of Nations players
Footballers from Paris
French people of Malian descent
Association football defenders
Mali international footballers